Peter Thomas Kirstein    (20 June 1933 – 8 January 2020) was a British computer scientist who played a role in the creation of the Internet. He put the first computer on the ARPANET outside of the US and was instrumental in defining and implementing TCP/IP alongside Vint Cerf and Bob Kahn.

Kirstein is often recognized as the "father of the European Internet".

Education and early life
Kirstein was born on 20 June 1933 in Berlin, Germany, the son of Eleanor (Jacobsohn) and Walter Kirschstein. His parents were dentists, and his father was awarded the Iron Cross during WWI. His family was Jewish and his mother had British citizenship from being born in London, so, fearing for their safety in Nazi governed-Germany the family immigrated to the UK in 1937.

He was educated at Highgate School in North London, received a Bachelor of Arts degree from University of Cambridge in 1954, an MSc and PhD in electrical engineering from Stanford University (in 1955 and 1957, respectively) and a Doctor of Science (DSc) in engineering from the University of London in 1970.

Career and research
He was a member of the staff at CERN from 1959 to 1963. He did research for General Electric at Zurich from 1963 to 1967. He was a professor at the University of London Institute of Computer Science (ICS) from 1970 to 1973. After that, he joined the faculty at the University College London in 1973, serving as the first head of the computer science department from 1980 to 1994. He supervised Jon Crowcroft. Kirstein set up Queen Elizabeth's first official email account in 1976.

Internet development 
Kirstein's research group at University College London was one of the two original international connections on the ARPANET in 1973, alongside Norwegian Seismic Array (NORSAR). UCL thereafter provided a gateway between the ARPANET and British academic networks which was the first international heterogeneous resource sharing network. 

Research led by Bob Kahn at DARPA and Vint Cerf at Stanford University and later DARPA resulted in the formulation of the Transmission Control Program (TCP), with its  specification written by Cerf with Yogen Dalal and Carl Sunshine in December 1974. The following year, testing began through concurrent implementations at Stanford, BBN and University College London. The ARPANET connection to UCL later grew into the trans-Atlantic SATNET. A three-way internetworking experiment linking UCL, via SATNET, with nodes in the ARPANET, and with a mobile vehicle in PRNET took place in 1977. 

In 1978, early in the development of the Internet, Kirstein co-authored (with Vint Cerf) one of the most significant early technical papers on the internetworking concept. His research group at UCL adopted TCP/IP in 1982, a year ahead of ARPANET, and played a significant role in the very earliest experimental Internet work.

Awards and honours 
Kirstein was appointed Commander of the Order of the British Empire (CBE) for his work on the Internet. He was also a Fellow of the Royal Academy of Engineering (FREng), a Fellow of the Institute of Electrical and Electronics Engineers, an Honorary Foreign Member of the American Academy of Arts and Sciences, and a Distinguished Fellow of the British Computer Society. He received the SIGCOMM Award in 1999 for "contributions to the practical understanding of large-scale networks through the deployment of international testbeds", and the Postel Award in 2003, as well as various other awards for his contributions to the development of the Internet internationally. He was also elected a member of the National Academy of Engineering in 2009 for contributions to computer networking and for leadership in bringing the Internet to Europe.

In 2012 Kirstein was inducted into the Internet Hall of Fame by the Internet Society. In 2015 he was awarded the prestigious Marconi Prize.

Personal life 
Peter Kirstein died from a brain tumour on the morning of 8 January 2020 while in his home. Shortly after his death, Professor Steve Hailes, Head of Department for UCL Computer Science, wrote about him:

See also 

 Cambridge Ring (computer network)
 Donald Davies, proposed, in 1965, a commercial national data network in the UK based on packet switching
 Internet in the United Kingdom § History
 Internet pioneers
 Royal Signals and Radar Establishment
 Sylvia Wilbur, a computer scientist who worked for Kirstein in his early ARPANET research

References

External links
The birth of the Internet in the UK Google video featuring Peter Kirstein, Vint Cerf, Roger Scantlebury, Peter Wilkinson, 2013
Home page
 Kirstein recognized with Postel Award
 Awarded BCS's distinguished fellowship

Deaths from brain tumor
British computer scientists
Fellows of the Institute of Physics
Fellows of the Royal Academy of Engineering
Academics of University College London
Commanders of the Order of the British Empire
Fellow Members of the IEEE
People educated at Highgate School
2020 deaths
1933 births
Fellows of the British Computer Society
Internet pioneers
Place of birth missing
People associated with CERN
English Jews
Jewish emigrants from Nazi Germany to the United Kingdom